Howard Town is a microbrewery established in 2005 in Glossop, Derbyshire, England. It distributes cask ale to pubs throughout Northern England.

Brewery
The brewery was established in the former Bridge End Fulling Mill with brewing kit from the Porter Brewing Co Ltd. In 2006, the mill caught fire and brewing was suspended until new premises were found at Hawkshead Mill in Old Glossop.

Beers
As well as the regular beers below, the brewery also produces occasional one-offs.

Mill Town (abv 3.5%)

Longdendale Lights (3.9%)

Monk's Gold (abv 4%)

Wren's Nest (abv 4.2%)

Gold, Best Bitter category Sheffield Beer Festival September 2006
Silver, Beer of Festival Sheffield Beer Festival September 2006
Gold, Best Bitter category SIBA Midlands Beer Competition 2006
Supreme Champion SIBA Midlands Beer Competition 2006
Gold, Best Bitter category SIBA National Beer Competition 2007
Supreme Champion SIBA National Beer Competition 2007

Superfortress (abv 4.4%)

Dark Peak (abv 6.0%)

References

External links
Official website

Breweries in England 
British companies established in 2005
Food and drink companies established in 2005